OSTC may refer to:
Oakland Schools Technical Campus, Michigan, US
Oligosaccharyltransferase complex subunit, human protein
Open Source Technology Center, run by Intel
Opportunity Scholarship Tax Credit, scholarship program in Pennsylvania, US
Owen Sound Transportation Company, Ontario, Canada